Henry William Bessemer (7 November 1865 – 26 April 1956) was a British philatelist who signed the Roll of Distinguished Philatelists in 1950.

Bessemer was an expert in the stamps of France, particularly the tête-bêche, and Bordeaux and Semeuse issues. In 1939 he won the Royal Philatelic Society London's Tilleard Medal. His collection was shown, hors concours, at the London International Stamp Exhibition 1950.

References

British philatelists
1865 births
1956 deaths
Signatories to the Roll of Distinguished Philatelists